The Château du Mirail is a castle in Toulouse.

References

External links
Photos on monumetum.fr

Châteaux in Haute-Garonne